The Serdi were a Celtic tribe inhabiting Thrace. They were located around Serdica, now Sofia in Bulgaria, which reflects their ethnonym. They would have established themselves in this area during the Celtic migrations at the end of the 4th century BC, though there is no evidence for their existence before the 1st century BC. Serdi are among traditional tribal names reported into the Roman era. They were gradually Thracianized over the centuries but retained their Celtic character in material culture up to a late date. According to other sources they may have been simply of Thracian origin; according to others they may have been of mixed Thraco-Celtic origin.

See also
Sofia
History of Sofia
List of Celtic tribes
List of ancient tribes in Thrace and Dacia

References

Historical Celtic peoples
Gauls